Yukihiro Takahashi (高橋 幸宏 Takahashi Yukihiro, June 6, 1952 – January 11, 2023) was a Japanese musician, singer, record producer, and actor, who was best known internationally as the drummer and lead vocalist of the Yellow Magic Orchestra, and as the former drummer of the Sadistic Mika Band.  He was also a member of the group METAFIVE.

Career
Takahashi first came to prominence as the drummer of the Sadistic Mika Band in the early 1970s, and became known to western audiences after this band (led by Kazuhiko Katō, formerly of The Folk Crusaders) toured and recorded in the United Kingdom. After the Sadistic Mika Band disbanded, some of the members (including Takahashi) formed another band called The Sadistics, who released several albums. Takahashi recorded his first solo album, Saravah, in 1977. In 1978, Takahashi joined Ryuichi Sakamoto and Haruomi Hosono to form the Yellow Magic Orchestra.

Throughout the 1980s, Takahashi also released a large number of solo albums, primarily intended for the Japanese market. Takahashi collaborated extensively with other musicians, including Bill Nelson, Iva Davies of Icehouse, Keiichi Suzuki of the Moonriders (often as a duo dubbed "The Beatniks", although Suzuki essentially functioned as a member of Takahashi's backing band during the Moonriders' brief hiatus) and in particular Steve Jansen. Takahashi has released a single Stay Close and an EP Pulse as a duo with Jansen.

Takahashi helped compose the soundtrack to the anime series Nadia: Secret of the Blue Water in 1989, including the song  "Families". Takahashi participated in temporary reunions of both the Sadistic Mika Band (missing the lead vocalist Mika who was replaced by Kaela Kimura), and The Yellow Magic Orchestra (YMO). Both of these reunions included tours of Japan, and an album of new material.

In the early 2000s, Takahashi became a member of the duo Sketch Show, with Haruomi Hosono. Sketch Show has released two albums, one of which, Loophole, has been released in the UK. Both Takahashi and Hosono have recently reunited with Sakamoto as HASYMO – a combination of Human Audio Sponge and Yellow Magic Orchestra. This collaboration produced a new single "Rescue" in 2007. Takahashi was still actively involved in music and its production, having released the solo album Life Anew on July 17, 2013, as well as anniversary and live albums. His latest work is Saravah, Saravah! (2018), a remastered reboot of his solo debut album which, along with re-recorded vocals, features appearances by Sakamoto, Hosono and other musicians.

Personal life
Takahashi was born in Tokyo, and began playing music from an early age. He was married to Kiyomi Takahashi.

Health and death
Takahashi suffered from temporary headaches since the beginning of summer 2020. While Takahashi initially thought that this was a temporary migraine, he finally subjected himself to an MRI scan. It was discovered that the headache was the result of a brain tumor. On August 13, 2020, Takahashi underwent surgery to remove the tumor; he announced that there were no after effects and that he would devote himself to treatment. On October 20, 2020, Takahashi announced through his social media that he had completed his course of treatment following the surgery.

On January 11, 2023, Takahashi died in Karuizawa, Nagano, from aspiration pneumonia, a complication of the brain tumor. He was 70.

Discography

Solo albums
 Saravah! (1978)
 Murdered by the Music (1980)
 Neuromantic (1981)
 What, Me Worry? (1982)
 Tomorrow's Just Another Day (1983)
 Time and Place (1984) (Live Album)
 Wild and Moody (1984)
 Poisson d'Avril (1985)
 The Brand New Day (1985) (Best of)
 Once a Fool (1985)
 Only When I Laugh (1986)
 La Pensee (1987) – with Yohji Yamamoto
 Ego (1988)
 Broadcast from Heaven (1990)
 A Day in the Next Life (1991)
 The Adventures of Gaku (1991)
 Umi Sora Sango no Iitsutae (1992)
 Life Time Happy Time (1992)
 Heart of Hurt (1992) (Unplugged best of)
 Ahiru no Uta ga Kikoete Kuru yo (1993)
 Mr YT (1994)
 I'm Not in Love (1995) (Best of)
 Fate of Gold (1995)
 Portrait with no Name (1996)
 A Sigh of Ghost (1997)
 Pulse:Pulse (with Steve Jansen) (1997)
 A Ray of Hope (1998)
 Yukihiro Takahashi Collection – Singles and More 1988–1996 (1998)
 "Run After You" (1998) (Live Album)
 The Dearest Fool (1999)
 "Fool On Earth" (2000) – remixes
 Blue Moon Blue (2006)
 Page by Page (2009)
 Life Anew (2013)
 Saravah, Saravah! (2018)
 Grand Espoir (2021) Compilation

Singles
 "C'est si bon"/"La Rosa" (Seven Seas, Japan 1978)
 "Murdered by the Music"/"Bijin Kiyoshi at the Swimming School" (Seven Seas Japan 1980, Statik UK 1982, Lyrics by Chris Mosdell)
 "Blue Colour Worker" (with Sandii, Lyrics by Chris Mosdell)/"Mirrormanic" (Seven Seas Japan 1980)
 "Drip Dry Eyes (single version)"/"Charge" (single version)" (Alfa UK 1981, Lyrics by Chris Mosdell)
 "Drip Dry Eyes (album version)"/"New Red Roses" (Alfa Spain 1981, Lyrics by Chris Mosdell)
 "Disposable Love"/"Flashback (single version)" (Alfa UK 1982)
 "School of Thought"/"Stop in the Name of Love" (Statik, UK 1982, Lyrics by Chris Mosdell) – plus remixed 12 inch version
 "Are You Receiving Me?"/"And I Love You" (Yen Japan 1982)
 "Maebure"/"Another Door" (Yen Japan 1983)
 "Stranger Things Have Happened (single version)"/"Kill The Thermostat" (Pick-Up/Warners Germany 1984)
 "Stranger Things Have Happened"/"Bounds of Reason"/"Metaphysical Jerks" (with Mick Karn and Bill Nelson) (Cocteau UK 1985)
 "Poisson D'Avril (single version)"/"Kimi ni Surprise!" (Yen Japan 1985)
 "Weekend"/? (Pony Canyon 1986)
 "Stay Close" 12 inch EP with Steve Jansen (Pony Canyon Japan, Rime Records UK 1986)
 "Look of Love"/? (Toshiba EMI Japan 1988)
 "Fait Accompli" (promotional single, Japan 1989) – with Steve Jansen
 "1 percent no Kankei" (Toshiba-EMI 1990)
 "Stronger Than Iron" (Toshiba-EMI 1991)
 "Xmas Day in the Next Life" EP of Christmas songs (Toshiba-EMI 1991)
 "Genki Nara Ureshiine" (Toshiba-EMI 1993)
 "Seppai No Hohemi" (Toshiba-EMI 1994)
 "Watermelon" (with Tokyo Ska Paradise Orchestra) (Toshiba-EMI 1995)

Filmography 
 A Y.M.O. FILM PROPAGANDA (1984)
 Tenkoku ni ichiban chikai shima (1984): Katsuki Jirô
 Shigatsu no sakana (1986): Nemoto Shôhei
 The Discarnates (1988)
 Otoko wa sore gaman dekinai (2006)
 20th century boys: Chapter 3-Our flag (2009): Billy
 Norwegian Wood (2010): Gatekeeper
 Labyrinth of Cinema (2020)

Games 
 Ginga no Sannin (1987, Nintendo)
 Sangokushi: Eiketsu Tenka ni Nozomu (1991, Naxat)
 Neugier: Umi to Kaze no Kodō (1993, Telenet Japan)
 FantaStep (1997, Jaleco)
 T kara Hajimaru Monogatari (1998, Jaleco) - Main Theme

References

External links 
More complete Japanese Discography

 
 
Album Reviews

1952 births
2023 deaths
Japanese dance musicians
Japanese drummers
Japanese electro musicians
Japanese electronic musicians
Japanese house musicians
Japanese record producers
Japanese male singer-songwriters
Japanese singer-songwriters
Japanese techno musicians
Japanese trance musicians
Singers from Tokyo
Sadistic Mika Band members
Yellow Magic Orchestra members
Deaths from brain cancer in Japan
Deaths from pneumonia in Japan
20th-century Japanese male musicians
21st-century Japanese male musicians